Alan Davies (born 29 December 1941), known professionally as Alan David, is a Welsh actor, best known for his stage and television roles.

Life and career
David was born in Merthyr Tydfil, Glamorgan.

After working in repertory at the Belgrade Theatre, Coventry and the Victoria Theatre, Stoke, David was a regular performer with the Royal Shakespeare Company between 1970 and 2003, most notably as Touchstone in As You Like It (1977), various rôles in the 1986 revival of Nicholas Nickleby and Polonius in Hamlet  (2001). His regular London appearances include parts at the National Theatre, Almeida Theatre and Royal Court Theatre.

He has had many television credits ranging from Coronation Street in 1973,  The Sweeney (1975) through to  Virtual Murder (1992), Honey for Tea and "The Unquiet Dead", an episode of Doctor Who in 2005. He also appeared as the 'rival' of Boycie as Llewellyn in The Green Green Grass. In 2007 he played Griff in the BBC series Gavin & Stacey.

Personal life 
David is married with two sons and lives in London.

Filmography

Film

Television

Theatre credits

References

External links

1941 births
Living people
People from Merthyr Tydfil
Royal Shakespeare Company members
Welsh male Shakespearean actors
Welsh male stage actors
Welsh male television actors